Brecke is a surname. Notable people with the surname include:

Andreas Brecke (1879–1952), Norwegian sailor 
Johannes Brecke (1877–1943), Norwegian businessman and politician

See also
Becke

Norwegian-language surnames